Cumberland County is a county in the State of New South Wales, Australia. Most of the Sydney metropolitan area is located within the County of Cumberland.

The County of Cumberland stretches from Broken Bay to the north, the Hawkesbury River to the north-west, the Nepean River to the west, the Cataract River to the south-west and the northern suburbs of Wollongong to the south. It includes the area of the Cumberland Plain.

History 

The name Cumberland was conferred by Governor Arthur Phillip in honour of Prince Henry Duke of Cumberland and Strathearn at a gathering to celebrate the birthday of his brother, King George III, on 4 June 1788. The county has been marked on maps since the start of the colony, as shown along the key on a 1789 map describing Port Jackson as being within the county of Cumberland. In the nineteenth century, parts of the county were in the South and North Riding electoral districts from 1856 to 1859, which were replaced by Central Cumberland. There was also the Cumberland Boroughs electoral district.

Cumberland County Council
The State of New South Wales is divided up into 141 counties, for the purposes of surveying and the registration of land titles. Few Australian counties have ever had any government or administrative function. However, the County of Cumberland did have a county government, the Cumberland County Council, from 1945 to 1964. Its responsibilities were primarily limited to town planning on the metropolitan scale. The Cumberland County Council was not elected by the people, but rather was elected by councillors of the various local governments within the county. The council consisted of 10 councillors each elected to a single constituency: No. 1 (Sydney), No. 2 (Marrickville, Canterbury), No. 3 (Randwick, Botany, Woollahra, Waverley), No. 4 (Rockdale, Hurstville, Kogarah, Sutherland), No. 5 (Strathfield, Ashfield, Burwood, Leichhardt, Drummoyne, Concord), No. 6 (Auburn, Bankstown, Holroyd, Parramatta), No. 7 (Mosman, Manly, North Sydney, Warringah), No. 8 (Hunter's Hill, Hornsby, Ku-ring-gai, Lane Cove, Ryde), No. 9 (Blacktown, Penrith, Baulkham Hills, Windsor) and No. 10 (Fairfield, Camden, Liverpool, Campbelltown, and parts of Wollondilly and Wollongong).

In 1948 the Council published the County of Cumberland planning scheme, a framework for accommodating expected postwar growth in the Sydney Basin. The objectives of the County Council were often in conflict with the aims of many State Government departments. For instance, the County Council's plans called for a green belt to encircle metropolitan Sydney, while the NSW Housing Commission wished to use much of this land to build new low-density public housing estates in areas such as Blacktown and Liverpool. As a result, the Cumberland County Council was dissolved in 1964.

Its metropolitan planning functions were taken over by a new body, the State Planning Authority, which has since been superseded by a succession of state government planning departments. , the planning department is the Department of Planning, Industry and Environment.

Chairmen

Hundreds 

There were thirteen hundreds in Cumberland County, which were published in a government gazette on 27 May 1835, but repealed on 21 January 1888. Unlike South Australia, the hundreds were never adopted anywhere else in New South Wales. The hundreds:
 Bringelly
 Campbelltown
 Dundas
 Evan
 Hardinge
 Liverpool
 Packenham
 Parramatta
 Richmond
 Southend
 Hundred of Sydney
 Windsor
 Woronora (shown as Heathcote on some maps)

Parishes

In 1835, Cumberland County was subdivided into 57 parishes. Previously, the subdivisions of the area since the beginning of the colony were called districts. Many of the parishes founded in 1835 kept the name of the district.  Others were named after Anglican churches in the same area. This included three of the four small parishes in the Sydney city area; St Philip (named after St.Philip's), St James (named after St. James, and which is still the region name today), St Andrew (named after St. Andrew's). However St Lawrence parish gave its name to the church, rather than the other way around. Further out of the city, the parishes of St John, St Luke, St Peter and St Matthew, in the Parramatta, Liverpool, Campbelltown and Windsor areas respectively, have Anglican churches which bear the same saints names; St John's in Parramatta (opened 1803); St.Luke's in Liverpool (building began 1818);  St.Peter's in Campbelltown (opened 1823, the third oldest Anglican church in Australia); and St. Matthew's in Windsor (consecrated in 1822)

A full list of parishes found within this county; the LGAs which the parish is mostly in (most parish boundaries do not match LGA boundaries exactly), and mapping coordinates to the approximate centre of each location is as follows:

Districts 

The first subdivisions of the county were called districts, shown in early maps from the period, such as 21 districts on an 1810 map and 37 districts on an 1824 map (not including Philip which was across the Nepean River and not part of the county). The districts in use in 1824:

Airds
Appin
Bankstown
Bathurst
Botany Bay
Bringelly
Bullanaming
Cambramatta
Castle Hill
Castlereagh
Concord
Cooke
Dundas
Eastern Plains
Evan District
Fields of Mars
Green Hills
Holsworthy
Hunter's Hill
Illawarra
Liberty Plains
Mecham
Melville
Meyrick
Minto
Nelson
Northern Boundary
Oxley
Parramatta
Petersham
Ponds
Prospect
Richmond
Sydney
Tongabee
Upper Minto
Upper Nelson

References

Counties of New South Wales
States and territories established in 1788
Geography of Sydney
1788 establishments in Australia